Hari Mirchi Lal Mirchi is an Indian Hindi television series which premiered on 27 October 2005 on DD National.

Cast
 Tushar Dalvi as Rohan Khanna
 Shalini Kapoor / Sucheta Khanna as Ritu Khanna: Rohan's first wife (2005–2007)
 Neeru Bajwa / Surbhi Tiwari / Shilpa Shinde / Tiya Verma / Malini Kapoor as Rinku Khanna: Rohan's second wife 

 Ashiesh Roy as Tutun: Rohan's friend
 Shahnawaz Pradhan as Ritu's father
 Anita Kanwal / Shubhangi Gokhale as Ritu's mother
 Suhita Thatte / Yamini Singh as  Rinku's mother 
 Madhavi Chopra as Munmun: Tutun's wife
 Firdaus Mevawalla as PK Daruwalla: Rohan's Boss
 Jhumma Mitra as Sapna: Rohan's secretary
 Melanie Nazareth secretary of Rohan
 Darshan Kumar
 Sharmilee Raj as Various characters
 Rohitash Gaud as Various characters
 Yash Mittal as Bittu: Rohan's son
Nivaan Sen as Brother In Law

References

External links
 

2005 Indian television series debuts
Hindi-language television shows